Marita Engzelius (born 9 February 1988) is a retired Norwegian professional golfer, who played on the Symetra Tour and the Ladies European Tour. She won the Symetra Tour Championship and was runner-up at the New South Wales Women's Open.

Amateur career
Engzelius won the Norwegian National Golf Championship three times (2007, 2010 and 2012) and was awarded the Kongepokal. She represented Norway at the Espirito Santo Trophy in 2010 and 2012.

Playing golf at the University of Tulsa between 2009 and 2012, she was a three-time All-Conference USA selection.

Professional career
Engzelius turned professional after finishing 24th at the LPGA Final Qualifying Tournament in December 2012, where she earned a place on the Symetra Tour and limited category for the 2013 LPGA Tour.

She played on the Symetra Tour from 2013 to 2017. In 2014 she eagled the first playoff hole to win the season-ending Symetra Tour Championship, to finish 15th on the money list.

Engzelius was successful at the Ladies European Tour's qualifying school in 2017, and played on the LET 2018 and 2019. She won the season opener in the LET Access Series, the Terre Blanche Ladies Open held in France, in April 2018. Her best finish on the LET was runner-up at the 2018 New South Wales Women's Open in Australia, two strokes behind Meghan MacLaren.

After 7 years on tour she announced her retirement at the Open de España Femenino in December 2019.

Amateur wins
2007 Norwegian National Golf Championship 
2010 Norwegian National Golf Championship 
2012 Norwegian National Golf Championship

Professional wins (2)

Symetra Tour (1)

LET Access Series wins (1)

Team appearances
Amateur
European Ladies' Team Championship (representing Norway): 2008, 2009, 2010, 2011
Espirito Santo Trophy (representing Norway): 2010, 2012

Professional
European Championships (representing Norway): 2018

References

External links

Norwegian female golfers
Tulsa Golden Hurricane women's golfers
LPGA Tour golfers
Ladies European Tour golfers
Sportspeople from Bærum
1988 births
Living people